Cambodia–United Kingdom relations refer to bilateral relations between the Kingdom of Cambodia and the United Kingdom of Great Britain and Northern Ireland. They established diplomatic relations in 1953, following Cambodia's independence from France. The UK was the first country to condemn the human rights record in Cambodia in 1978. The British embassy was opened in Phnom Penh in 1953 until March 1975, a month before the Khmer Rouge-takeover. It was reopened in 1991 following the signing of the Paris Peace Accords. Cambodia has an embassy in London.

History

UK assistance

The United Kingdom is a significant contributor to the Extraordinary Chambers in the Courts of Cambodia.

The UK contributes to Cambodia around £10m per year, mainly to promote democratic reform, human rights and good governance, health, education, urban poverty projects, the development of rural livelihoods, and to tackle the growing problems of paedophilia, people trafficking, forestry crime, and the spread of HIV.

References

 
United Kingdom
Bilateral relations of the United Kingdom